The Shanes were a Swedish rock band active from 1963 to 1969.

The group played in a variety of British- and American-influenced styles, including British R&B, Merseybeat, and instrumental pop. They were successful in their home country, landing a string of top ten hit singles, including "Chris-Craft No. 9", which reached number 2 there in 1967. They released one single in the UK on Columbia Records, "I Don't Want Your Love", but it did not chart there.

Members
Lennart Grahn – vocals
Tommy Wåhlberg – guitar, vocals
Staffan Berggren – lead guitar, vocals
Tor-Erik Rautio – drums
Kit Sundqvist – keyboards, guitar, vocals
Rolf Carvenius – saxophone
Svante Elfgren – bass

Discography

LPs 

 Let Us Show You! (1964)
 The Shanegang (1965)
 Shanes Again! (1966)
 Ssss Shanes! (1967)
 VI (1967)

Swedish singles

EPs 

 Shanes-Moonlighters live! (1965; Columbia SEGS-138)
 Let Me Tell Yah (1966; Columbia SEGS-147)
 Hi-Lili, Hi-Lo (1966; La Voz De Su Amo [Spain] EPL-14.302)

Compilations 

 The Best Of Shanes (1969)
 Shanes, 1963-68! (1983)
 Strictly Instrumental (1987)
 Hep Stars! Tages! Shanes! (1991)
 Bästa (1991)
 Hi Lili Hi Lo (1997)
 The Shanes (2000)
 The Shanes Original Album Series (2012)
 Let Them Show You: The Anthology 1964-1967 (2014)

References

Swedish rock music groups
Musical groups established in 1963
Melodifestivalen contestants of 1992